Odontodiaptomus thomseni is a species of crustacean in the family Diaptomidae. It is found in Uruguay and Venezuela.

References

Fauna of Uruguay
Diaptomidae
Freshwater crustaceans of South America
Crustaceans described in 1933
Taxonomy articles created by Polbot